Coequosa is a genus of moths in the family Sphingidae first described by Francis Walker in 1856.

Species
Coequosa australasiae (Donovan, 1805)
Coequosa triangularis (Donovan, 1805)

References

Smerinthini
Moth genera
Taxa named by Francis Walker (entomologist)